was a Marshal Admiral of the Imperial Japanese Navy (IJN) and the commander-in-chief of the Combined Fleet during World War II until he was killed.

Yamamoto held several important posts in the IJN, and undertook many of its changes and reorganizations, especially its development of naval aviation. He was the commander-in-chief during the early years of the Pacific War and oversaw major engagements including the attack on Pearl Harbor and the Battle of Midway. 

Yamamoto was killed in April 1943 after American code breakers identified his flight plans, enabling the United States Army Air Forces to shoot down his plane. His death was a major blow to Japanese military morale during World War II.

Family background
Yamamoto was born  in Nagaoka, Niigata. His father, Sadayoshi Takano (高野 貞吉), was an intermediate-rank samurai of the Nagaoka Domain. "Isoroku" is an old Japanese term meaning "56"; the name referred to his father's age at Isoroku's birth.

In 1916, Isoroku was adopted into the Yamamoto family (another family of former Nagaoka samurai) and took the Yamamoto name. It was a common practice for samurai families lacking sons to adopt suitable young men in this fashion to carry on the family name, the rank and the income that went with it. Isoroku married Reiko Mihashi in 1918; they had two sons and two daughters.

Early career

Yamamoto graduated from the Imperial Japanese Naval Academy in 1904, ranking 11th in his class. He then subsequently served on the armored cruiser  during the Russo-Japanese War. He was wounded at the Battle of Tsushima, losing two fingers (the index and middle fingers) on his left hand, as the cruiser was hit repeatedly by the Russian battle line. He returned to the Naval Staff College in 1914, emerging as a lieutenant commander in 1916. In December 1919, he was promoted to commander.

1920s and 1930s

Yamamoto was part of the Japanese Navy establishment, who were rivals of the more aggressive Army establishment, especially the officers of the Kwantung Army. He promoted a policy of a strong fleet to project force through gunboat diplomacy, rather than a fleet used primarily for the transport of invasion land forces, as some of his political opponents in the Army wanted. This stance led him to oppose the invasion of China. He also opposed war against the United States, partly because of his studies at Harvard University (1919–1921) and his two postings as a naval attaché in Washington, D.C., where he learned to speak fluent English. Yamamoto traveled extensively in the United States during his tour of duty there, where he studied American customs and business practices.

He was promoted to captain in 1923. On February 13, 1924, Captain Yamamoto was part of the Japanese delegation visiting the United States Naval War College. Later that year, he changed his specialty from gunnery to naval aviation. His first command was the cruiser  in 1928, followed by the aircraft carrier .

He participated in the London Naval Conference 1930 as a rear admiral and the London Naval Conference 1935 as a vice admiral, as the growing military influence on the government at the time deemed that a career military specialist needed to accompany the diplomats to the arms limitations talks. Yamamoto was a strong proponent of naval aviation and served as head of the Aeronautics Department, before accepting a post as commander of the First Carrier Division. Yamamoto opposed the Japanese invasion of northeast China in 1931, the subsequent full-scale land war with China in 1937, and the Tripartite Pact with Nazi Germany and Fascist Italy in 1940. As Deputy Navy Minister, he apologized to United States Ambassador Joseph C. Grew for the bombing of the gunboat USS Panay in December 1937. These issues made him a target of assassination threats by pro-war militarists.

Throughout 1938, many young army and naval officers began to speak publicly against Yamamoto and certain other Japanese admirals, such as Mitsumasa Yonai and Shigeyoshi Inoue, for their strong opposition to a tripartite pact with Nazi Germany and Fascist Italy, which the admirals saw as inimical to "Japan's natural interests". Yamamoto received a steady stream of hate mail and death threats from Japanese nationalists. His reaction to the prospect of death by assassination was passive and accepting. The admiral wrote:
To die for Emperor and Nation is the highest hope of a military man. After a brave hard fight the blossoms are scattered on the fighting field. But if a person wants to take a life instead, still the fighting man will go to eternity for Emperor and country. One man's life or death is a matter of no importance. All that matters is the Empire. As Confucius said, "They may crush cinnabar, yet they do not take away its color; one may burn a fragrant herb, yet it will not destroy the scent." They may destroy my body, yet they will not take away my will.

The Japanese Army, annoyed at Yamamoto's unflinching opposition to a Rome-Berlin-Tokyo treaty, dispatched military police to "guard" him, a ruse by the Army to keep an eye on him. He was later reassigned from the naval ministry to sea as the commander-in-chief of the Combined Fleet on August 30, 1939. This was done as one of the last acts of acting Navy Minister Mitsumasa Yonai, under Baron Hiranuma Kiichirō's short-lived administration. It was done partly to make it harder for assassins to target Yamamoto. Yonai was certain that if Yamamoto remained ashore, he would be killed before the year [1939] ended.

1940–1941
Yamamoto was promoted to admiral on November 15, 1940. This was in spite of the fact that when Hideki Tojo was appointed Prime Minister on October 18, 1941, many political observers thought that Yamamoto's career was essentially over. Tojo had been Yamamoto's old opponent from the time when the latter served as Japan's deputy naval minister and Tojo was the prime mover behind Japan's takeover of Manchuria. It was believed that Yamamoto would be appointed to command the Yokosuka Naval Base, "a nice safe demotion with a big house and no power at all". However, after a brief stint in the post, a new Japanese cabinet was announced, and Yamamoto found himself returned to his position of power despite his open conflict with Tojo and other members of the Army's oligarchy who favored war with the European powers and the United States.

Two of the main reasons for Yamamoto's political survival were his immense popularity within the fleet, where he commanded the respect of his men and officers, and his close relations with the imperial family. He also had the acceptance of Japan's naval hierarchy:
There was no officer more competent to lead the Combined Fleet to victory than Admiral Yamamoto. His daring plan for the Pearl Harbor attack had passed through the crucible of the Japanese naval establishment, and after many expressed misgivings, his fellow admirals had realized that Yamamoto spoke no more than the truth when he said that Japan's hope for victory in this [upcoming] war was limited by time and oil. Every sensible officer of the navy was well aware of the perennial oil problems. Also, it had to be recognized that if the enemy could seriously disturb Japanese merchant shipping, then the fleet would be endangered even more.

Consequently, Yamamoto stayed in his post. With Tojo now in charge of Japan's highest political office, it became clear the Army would lead the Navy into a war about which Yamamoto had serious reservations. He wrote to an ultranationalist:
Should hostilities once break out between Japan and the United States, it would not be enough that we take Guam and the Philippines, nor even Hawaii and San Francisco. To make victory certain, we would have to march into Washington and dictate the terms of peace in the White House. I wonder if our politicians [who speak so lightly of a Japanese-American war] have confidence as to the final outcome and are prepared to make the necessary sacrifices.

This quote was spread by the militarists, minus the last sentence, so it was interpreted in America as a boast that Japan would conquer the entire continental United States. The omitted sentence showed Yamamoto's counsel of caution towards a war that could cost Japan dearly. Nevertheless, Yamamoto accepted the reality of impending war and planned for a quick victory by destroying the United States Pacific Fleet at Pearl Harbor in a preventive strike, while simultaneously thrusting into the oil- and rubber-rich areas of Southeast Asia, especially the Dutch East Indies, Borneo, and Malaya.

Yamamoto was responsible for a number of innovations in Japanese naval aviation. Although remembered for his association with aircraft carriers, Yamamoto did more to influence the development of land-based naval aviation, particularly the Mitsubishi G3M and G4M medium bombers. His demand for great range and the ability to carry a torpedo was intended to conform to Japanese conceptions of bleeding the American fleet as it advanced across the Pacific. The planes did achieve long range, but long-range fighter escorts were not available. These planes were lightly constructed and when fully fueled, they were especially vulnerable to enemy fire. This earned the G4M the sardonic nickname the "flying cigarette lighter". Yamamoto would eventually die in one of these aircraft.

The range of the G3M and G4M contributed to a demand for great range in a fighter aircraft. This partly drove the requirements for the A6M Zero, which was as noteworthy for its range as for its maneuverability. Both qualities were again purchased at the expense of light construction and flammability that later contributed to the A6M's high casualty rates as the war progressed.

As Japan moved toward war during 1940, Yamamoto gradually moved toward strategic as well as tactical innovation, again with mixed results. Prompted by talented young officers such as Lieutenant Commander Minoru Genda, Yamamoto approved the reorganization of Japanese carrier forces into the First Air Fleet, a consolidated striking force that gathered Japan's six largest carriers into one unit. This innovation gave great striking capacity, but also concentrated the vulnerable carriers into a compact target. Yamamoto also oversaw the organization of a similar large land-based organization in the 11th Air Fleet, which would later use the G3M and G4M to neutralize American air forces in the Philippines and sink the British Force Z.

In January 1941, Yamamoto went even further and proposed a radical revision of Japanese naval strategy. For two decades, in keeping with the doctrine of Captain Alfred T. Mahan,<ref>Mahan, The Influence of Seapower on History</ref> the Naval General Staff had planned in terms of Japanese light surface forces, submarines, and land-based air units whittling down the American fleet as it advanced across the Pacific until the Japanese Navy engaged it in a climactic Kantai Kessen ("decisive battle") in the northern Philippine Sea (between the Ryukyu Islands and the Marianas), with battleships fighting in traditional battle lines.

Correctly pointing out this plan had never worked even in Japanese war games, and painfully aware of American strategic advantages in military production capacity, Yamamoto proposed instead to seek parity with the Americans by first reducing their forces with a preventive strike, then following up with a "decisive battle" fought offensively, rather than defensively. Yamamoto hoped, but probably did not believe, that if the Americans could be dealt terrific blows early in the war, they might be willing to negotiate an end to the conflict. The Naval General Staff proved reluctant to go along, and Yamamoto was eventually driven to capitalize on his popularity in the fleet by threatening to resign to get his way. Admiral Osami Nagano and the Naval General Staff eventually caved in to this pressure, but only insofar as approving the attack on Pearl Harbor.

The First Air Fleet commenced preparations for the Pearl Harbor raid, solving a number of technical problems along the way, including how to launch torpedoes in the shallow waters of Pearl Harbor and how to craft armor-piercing bombs by machining down battleship gun projectiles.

Attack on Pearl Harbor

Although the United States and Japan were officially at peace, the First Air Fleet of six carriers attacked on December 7, 1941, launching 353 aircraft against Pearl Harbor and other locations within Honolulu in two waves. The attack was a success according to the parameters of the mission, which sought to sink at least four American battleships and prevent the United States from interfering in Japan's southward advance for at least six months. Three American aircraft carriers were also considered a choice target, but these were at sea at the time.

In the end, four American battleships were sunk, four were damaged, and eleven other cruisers, destroyers, and auxiliaries were sunk or seriously damaged, 188 American aircraft were destroyed and 159 others damaged, and 2,403 people were killed and 1,178 others wounded. The Japanese lost 64 servicemen and only 29 aircraft, with 74 others damaged by anti-aircraft fire from the ground. The damaged aircraft were disproportionately dive and torpedo bombers, seriously reducing the ability to exploit the first two waves' success, so the commander of the First Air Fleet, Naval Vice Admiral Chuichi Nagumo, withdrew. Yamamoto later lamented Nagumo's failure to seize the initiative to seek out and destroy the American carriers or further bombard various strategically important facilities on Oahu.

Nagumo had absolutely no idea where the American carriers were, and remaining on station while his forces looked for them ran the risk of his own forces being found first and attacked while his aircraft were absent searching. In any case, insufficient daylight remained after recovering the aircraft from the first two waves for the carriers to launch and recover a third before dark, and Nagumo's escorting destroyers lacked the fuel capacity to loiter long. Much has been made of Yamamoto's hindsight, but in keeping with Japanese military tradition to not criticize the commander on the spot, he did not punish Nagumo for his withdrawal.

On the strategic, moral, and political level, the attack was a disaster for Japan, rousing Americans' thirst for revenge due to what is now famously called a "sneak attack". The shock of the attack, coming in an unexpected place with devastating results and without a declaration of war, galvanized the American public's determination to avenge the attack. When asked by Prime Minister Fumimaro Konoe in mid-1941 about the outcome of a possible war with the United States, Yamamoto made a well-known and prophetic statement: If ordered to fight, he said, "I shall run wild considerably for the first six months or a year, but I have utterly no confidence for the second and third years." His prediction would be validated, as Japan easily conquered territories and islands in Asia and the Pacific for the first six months of the war, before suffering a major defeat at the Battle of Midway on June 4–7, 1942, which ultimately tilted the balance of power in the Pacific toward the United States.

December 1941 – May 1942

With the American fleet largely neutralized at Pearl Harbor, Yamamoto's Combined Fleet turned to the task of executing the larger Japanese war plan devised by the Imperial Japanese Army and Navy General Staff. The First Air Fleet made a circuit of the Pacific, striking American, Australian, Dutch, and British installations from Wake Island to Australia to Ceylon in the Indian Ocean. The 11th Air Fleet caught the United States Fifth Air Force on the ground in the Philippines hours after Pearl Harbor, and then sank the British Force Z's battleship  and battlecruiser  at sea.

Under Yamamoto's able subordinates, Vice Admirals Jisaburō Ozawa, Nobutake Kondō, and Ibō Takahashi, the Japanese swept the inadequate remaining American, British, Dutch and Australian naval assets from the Dutch East Indies in a series of amphibious landings and surface naval battles culminating in the Battle of the Java Sea on February 27, 1942. Along with the occupation of the Dutch East Indies came the fall of Singapore on February 15, and the eventual reduction of the remaining American-Filipino defensive positions in the Philippines on the Bataan peninsula on April 9 and Corregidor Island on May 6. The Japanese had secured their oil- and rubber-rich "southern resources area".

By late March, having achieved their initial aims with surprising speed and little loss, albeit against enemies ill-prepared to resist them, the Japanese paused to consider their next moves. Yamamoto and a few Japanese military leaders and officials waited, hoping that the United States or Great Britain would negotiate an armistice or a peace treaty to end the war. But when the British, as well as the Americans, expressed no interest in negotiating, Japanese thoughts turned to securing their newly seized territory and acquiring more with an eye to driving one or more of their enemies out of the war.

Competing plans were developed at this stage, including thrusts to the west against British India, south against Australia, and east against the United States. Yamamoto was involved in this debate, supporting different plans at different times with varying degrees of enthusiasm and for varying purposes, including "horse-trading" for support of his own objectives.

Plans included ideas as ambitious as invading India or Australia, or seizing Hawaii. These grandiose ventures were inevitably set aside, as the Army could not spare enough troops from China for the first two, which would require a minimum of 250,000 men, nor shipping to support the latter two (transports were allocated separately to the Navy and Army, and jealously guarded). Instead, the Imperial General Staff supported an army thrust into Burma in hopes of linking up with Indian nationalists revolting against British rule, and attacks in New Guinea and the Solomon Islands designed to imperil Australia's lines of communication with the United States. Yamamoto argued for a decisive offensive strike in the east to finish off the American fleet, but the more conservative Naval General Staff officers were unwilling to risk it.

On April 18, in the midst of these debates, the Doolittle Raid struck Tokyo and surrounding areas, demonstrating the threat posed by American aircraft carriers, and giving Yamamoto an event he could exploit to get his way, and further debate over military strategy came to a quick end. The Naval General Staff agreed to Yamamoto's Midway Island (MI) Operation, subsequent to the first phase of the operations against Australia's link with America, and concurrent with its plan to invade the Aleutian Islands.

Yamamoto rushed planning for the Midway and Aleutians missions, while dispatching a force under Vice Admiral Takeo Takagi, including the Fifth Carrier Division (the large new carriers  and ), to support the effort to seize the islands of Tulagi and Guadalcanal for seaplane and airplane bases, and the town of Port Moresby on Papua New Guinea's south coast facing Australia.

The Port Moresby (MO) Operation proved an unwelcome setback. Although Tulagi and Guadalcanal were taken, the Port Moresby invasion fleet was compelled to turn back when Takagi clashed with an American carrier task force in the Battle of the Coral Sea in early May. Just as importantly, Japanese operational mishaps and American fighters and anti-aircraft fire devastated the dive bomber and torpedo plane formations of both Shōkakus and Zuikakus air groups. These losses sidelined Zuikaku while she awaited replacement aircraft and aircrews, and saw to tactical integration and training. These two ships would be sorely missed a month later at Midway.

Battle of Midway, June 1942

Yamamoto's plan for Midway Island was an extension of his efforts to knock the American Pacific Fleet out of action long enough for Japan to fortify its defensive perimeter in the Pacific island chains. Yamamoto felt it necessary to seek an early, offensive decisive battle.

This plan was long believed to have been to draw American attention—and possibly carrier forces—north from Pearl Harbor by sending his Fifth Fleet (one carrier, one light carrier, four battleships, eight cruisers, 25 destroyers, and four transports) against the Aleutians, raiding Dutch Harbor on Unalaska Island and invading the more distant islands of Kiska and Attu.

While Fifth Fleet attacked the Aleutians, First Mobile Force (four carriers, two battleships, three cruisers, and 12 destroyers) would attack Midway and destroy its air force. Once this was neutralized, Second Fleet (one light carrier, two battleships, 10 cruisers, 21 destroyers, and 11 transports) would land 5,000 troops to seize the atoll from the United States Marines.

The seizure of Midway was expected to draw the American carriers west into a trap where the First Mobile Force would engage and destroy them. Afterwards, First Fleet (one light carrier, three battleships, one light cruiser and nine destroyers), in conjunction with elements of Second Fleet, would mop up remaining US surface forces and complete the destruction of the American Pacific Fleet.

To guard against failure, Yamamoto initiated two security measures. The first was an aerial reconnaissance mission (Operation K) over Pearl Harbor to ascertain if the American carriers were there. The second was a picket line of submarines to detect the movement of enemy carriers toward Midway in time for First Mobile Force, First Fleet, and Second Fleet to combine against it. In the event, the first measure was aborted and the second delayed until after the American carriers had already sortied.

The plan was a compromise and hastily prepared, apparently so it could be launched in time for the anniversary of the Battle of Tsushima, but appeared well thought out, well organized, and finely timed when viewed from a Japanese viewpoint. Against four fleet carriers, two light carriers, seven battleships, 14 cruisers and 42 destroyers likely to be in the area of the main battle, the United States could field only three carriers, eight cruisers, and 15 destroyers. The disparity appeared crushing. Only in numbers of carrier decks, available aircraft, and submarines was there near parity between the two sides. Despite various mishaps developed in the execution, it appeared that—barring something unforeseen—Yamamoto held all the cards.

Unknown to Yamamoto, the Americans had learned of Japanese plans thanks to the code breaking of Japanese naval code D (known to the US as JN-25). As a result, Admiral Chester Nimitz, the Pacific Fleet commander, was able to place his outnumbered forces in a position to conduct their own ambush. By Nimitz's calculation, his three available carrier decks, plus Midway, gave him rough parity with Nagumo's First Mobile Force.

Following a nuisance raid by Japanese flying boats in May, Nimitz dispatched a minesweeper to guard the intended refueling point for Operation K near French Frigate Shoals, causing the reconnaissance mission to be aborted and leaving Yamamoto ignorant of whether the Pacific Fleet carriers were still at Pearl Harbor. It remains unclear why Yamamoto permitted the earlier attack, and why his submarines did not sortie sooner, as reconnaissance was essential to success at Midway. Nimitz also dispatched his carriers toward Midway early, and they passed the Japanese submarines en route to their picket line positions. Nimitz's carriers positioned themselves to ambush the Kidō Butai (striking force) when it struck Midway. A token cruiser and destroyer force was sent toward the Aleutians, but otherwise Nimitz ignored them. On June 4, 1942, days before Yamamoto expected them to interfere in the Midway operation, American carrier-based aircraft destroyed the four carriers of the Kidō  Butai, catching the Japanese carriers at especially vulnerable times.

With his air power destroyed and his forces not yet concentrated for a fleet battle, Yamamoto maneuvered his remaining forces, still strong on paper, to trap the American forces. He was unable to do so because his initial dispositions had placed his surface combatants too far from Midway, and because Admiral Raymond Spruance prudently withdrew to the east to further defend Midway Island, believing (based on a mistaken submarine report) the Japanese still intended to invade. Not knowing several battleships, including the powerful , were in the Japanese order of battle, he did not comprehend the severe risk of a night surface battle, in which his carriers and cruisers would be at a disadvantage. However, his move to the east avoided that possibility. Correctly perceiving he had lost and could not bring surface forces into action, Yamamoto withdrew. The defeat marked the high tide of Japanese expansion.

Yamamoto's plan has been the subject of much criticism. Some historians state it violated the principle of concentration of force and was overly complex. Others point to similarly complex Allied operations, such as Operation MB8, that were successful, and note the extent to which the American intelligence coup derailed the operation before it began. Had Yamamoto's dispositions not denied Nagumo adequate pre-attack reconnaissance assets, both the American cryptanalytic success and the unexpected appearance of the American carriers would have been irrelevant.

Actions after Midway

The Battle of Midway checked Japanese momentum, but the Japanese Navy was still a powerful force, capable of regaining the initiative. It planned to resume the thrust with Operation FS, aimed at eventually taking Samoa and Fiji to cut the American lifeline to Australia.

Yamamoto remained as commander-in-chief, retained at least partly to avoid diminishing the morale of the Combined Fleet. However, he had lost face as a result of the Midway defeat, and the Naval General Staff were disinclined to indulge in further gambles. This reduced Yamamoto to pursuing the classic defensive "decisive battle strategy" he had attempted to avoid.

Yamamoto committed Combined Fleet units to a series of small attrition actions across the south and central Pacific that stung the Americans, but in return suffered losses he could ill afford. Three major efforts to beat the Americans moving on Guadalcanal precipitated a pair of carrier battles that Yamamoto commanded personally: the Battles of the Eastern Solomons and Santa Cruz Islands in September and October, respectively, and finally a pair of wild surface engagements in November, all timed to coincide with Japanese Army pushes. The effort was wasted when the Army could not hold up its end of the operation. Yamamoto's naval forces won a few victories and inflicted considerable losses and damage to the American fleet in several battles around Guadalcanal which included the Battles of Savo Island, Cape Esperance, and Tassafaronga, but he could never draw the United States into a decisive fleet action. As a result, Japanese naval strength declined.

Death

To boost morale following the defeat at Guadalcanal, Yamamoto decided to make an inspection tour throughout the South Pacific. It was during this tour that U.S. officials commenced an operation to kill him. On April 14, 1943, the United States naval intelligence effort, codenamed "Magic", intercepted and decrypted a message containing specifics of Yamamoto's tour, including arrival and departure times and locations, as well as the number and types of aircraft that would transport and accompany him on the journey. Yamamoto, the itinerary revealed, would be flying from Rabaul to Balalae Airfield, on an island near Bougainville in the Solomon Islands, on the morning of April 18, 1943.

President Franklin D. Roosevelt may have authorized Secretary of the Navy Frank Knox to "get Yamamoto", but no official record of such an order exists, and sources disagree whether he did so.  Knox essentially let Admiral Chester W. Nimitz make the decision. Nimitz first consulted Admiral William Halsey Jr., Commander, South Pacific, and then authorized the mission on April 17 to intercept and shoot down Yamamoto's flight en route. A squadron of United States Army Air Forces Lockheed P-38 Lightning aircraft were assigned the task as only they possessed sufficient range. Select pilots from three units were informed that they were intercepting an "important high officer", with no specific name given.

On the morning of April 18, despite urging by local commanders to cancel the trip for fear of ambush, Yamamoto's two Mitsubishi G4M bombers, used as fast transport aircraft without bombs, left Rabaul as scheduled for the  trip. Sixteen P-38s intercepted the flight over Bougainville, and a dogfight ensued between them and the six escorting Mitsubishi A6M Zeroes. First Lieutenant Rex T. Barber engaged the first of the two Japanese transports, which turned out to be T1-323 (Yamamoto's aircraft). He fired on the aircraft until it began to spew smoke from its left engine. Barber turned away to attack the other transport as Yamamoto's plane crashed into the jungle.

Yamamoto's body, along with the crash site, was found the next day in the jungle of the island of Bougainville by a Japanese search-and-rescue party, led by army engineer Lieutenant Tsuyoshi Hamasuna. According to Hamasuna, Yamamoto had been thrown clear of the plane's wreckage, his white-gloved hand grasping the hilt of his katana, still upright in his seat under a tree. Hamasuna said Yamamoto was instantly recognizable, head dipped down as if deep in thought. A post-mortem disclosed that Yamamoto had received two .50-caliber bullet wounds, one to the back of his left shoulder and another to the left side of his lower jaw that exited above his right eye. The Japanese navy doctor examining the body determined that the head wound had killed Yamamoto. The more violent details of Yamamoto's death were hidden from the Japanese public. The medical report was changed "on orders from above", according to biographer Hiroyuki Agawa.Agawa 2000, p. 364

Yamamoto's staff cremated his remains at Buin, Papua New Guinea, and his ashes were returned to Tokyo aboard the battleship , his last flagship. He was given a full state funeral on June 5, 1943, where he received, posthumously, the title of Marshal Admiral and was awarded the Order of the Chrysanthemum (1st Class). He was also awarded Nazi Germany's Knight's Cross of the Iron Cross with Oak Leaves and Swords. Some of his ashes were buried in the public Tama Cemetery, Tokyo (多摩霊園) and the remainder at his ancestral burial grounds at the temple of Chuko-ji in Nagaoka City. He was succeeded as commander-in-chief of the Combined Fleet by Admiral Mineichi Koga.

In the years following Admiral Yamamoto's death, debate has arisen regarding whether he was assassinated rather than legally killed. Colonel Hays Parks, one of the U.S. government's foremost legal experts, wrote in his "Memorandum of Law: Executive Order 12333 and Assassination" that Admiral Yamamoto was killed because of his status as an enemy combatant in compliance with the applicable laws of war. Parks wrote that "enemy combatants are legitimate targets at all times, regardless of their duties or activities at the time of their attack. Such attacks do not constitute assassination unless carried out in a 'treacherous' manner, as prohibited by article 23(b) of the Annex to the Hague Regulations (Hague Convention IV) of 1907."

Personal life

Yamamoto practiced calligraphy. He and his wife, Reiko, had four children: two sons and two daughters. Yamamoto was an avid gambler, enjoying Go, shogi, billiards, bridge, mahjong, poker, and other games that tested his wits and sharpened his mind. He frequently made jokes about moving to Monaco and starting his own casino.

He enjoyed the company of geisha, and his wife Reiko revealed to the Japanese public in 1954 that Yamamoto was closer to his favorite geisha Kawai Chiyoko than to her, which stirred some controversy. His funeral procession passed by Kawai's quarters on the way to the cemetery. Yamamoto was close friends with Teikichi Hori, a Navy admiral and Yamamoto's classmate from the Imperial Japanese Naval Academy who was purged from the Navy for supporting the Washington Naval Treaty. Before and during the war Yamamoto frequently corresponded with Hori, these personal letters would become the subject of the NHK documentary The Truth of Yamamoto.

The claim that Yamamoto was a Catholic is likely due to confusion with retired Admiral Shinjiro Stefano Yamamoto, who was a decade older than Isoroku, and died in 1942.

Decorations
 Grand Cordon of the Order of the Chrysanthemum (posthumous appointment, 18 April 1943) 
 Grand Cordon of the Order of the Rising Sun with Paulownia Flowers (4 April 1942)
 Grand Cordon of the Order of the Rising Sun (29 April 1940)
 Grand Cordon of the Order of the Sacred Treasure (23 March 1939; Second Class: 31 October 1931)
 Order of the Golden Kite (1st class: 18 April 1943 (posthumous); Second Class: 4 April 1942)
 Grand Cross of the Order of the German Eagle (Nazi Germany, 9 February 1940)
 Knight's Cross of the Iron Cross with Oak Leaves and Swords (Nazi Germany, 27 May 1943 (posthumous))

Dates of rank
 Midshipman—November 14, 1904
 Ensign—August 31, 1905
 Sublieutenant—September 28, 1907
 Lieutenant—October 11, 1909
 Lieutenant Commander—December 13, 1915
 Commander—December 1, 1919
 Captain—December 1, 1923
 Rear Admiral—November 30, 1929
 Vice Admiral—November 15, 1934
 Admiral—November 15, 1940
 Marshal-Admiral—April 18, 1943 (posthumous)

In popular culture
Since the end of the Second World War, a number of Japanese and American films have depicted the character of Isoroku Yamamoto.

One of the most notable films is the 1970 movie Tora! Tora! Tora!, which stars Japanese actor Sô Yamamura as Yamamoto, who states after the attack on Pearl Harbor:

The first film to feature Yamamoto was Toho's 1953 film Eagle of the Pacific, in which Yamamoto was portrayed by Denjirô Ôkôchi.

The 1960 film The Gallant Hours depicts the battle of wits between Vice-Admiral William Halsey, Jr. and Yamamoto from the start of the Guadalcanal Campaign in August 1942 to Yamamoto's death in April 1943. The film, however, portrays Yamamoto's death as occurring in November 1942, the day after the Naval Battle of Guadalcanal, and the P-38 aircraft that killed him as coming from Guadalcanal.

In Daiei Studios's 1969 film Aa, kaigun (later released in the United States as Gateway to Glory), Yamamoto was portrayed by Shôgo Shimada.Gateway to Glory (1970). Turner Classic Movies.

Professional wrestler Harold Watanabe adopted the villainous Japanese gimmick of Tojo Yamamoto in reference to both Yamamoto and Hideki Tojo.

Award-winning Japanese actor Toshiro Mifune (star of The Seven Samurai) portrayed Yamamoto in three films:
 Rengō Kantai Shirei Chōkan: Yamamoto Isoroku (1968, later released in Canada and the United States as Admiral Yamamoto),
 Gekido no showashi 'Gunbatsu'  (1970, lit. "Turning Point of Showa History: The Militarists"), and
 Midway (1976, where all of the Japanese scenes had English dialogue).

A fictionalized version of Yamamoto's death was portrayed in the Baa Baa Black Sheep episode "The Hawk Flies on Sunday", though only photos of Yamamoto were shown. In this episode, set much later in the war than in real life, the Black Sheep, a Marine Corsair squadron, joins an army squadron of P-51 Mustangs. The Marines intercepted fighter cover while the army shot down Yamamoto.

In Shūe Matsubayashi's 1981 film Rengō kantai (lit. "Combined Fleet", later released in the United States as The Imperial Navy), Yamamoto was portrayed by Keiju Kobayashi.

In the 1993 OVA series Konpeki no Kantai (lit. Deep Blue Fleet), instead of dying in the plane crash, Yamamoto blacks out and suddenly wakes up as his younger self, Isoroku Takano, after the Battle of Tsushima in 1905. His memory from the original timeline intact, Yamamoto uses his knowledge of the future to help Japan become a stronger military power, eventually launching a coup d'état against Hideki Tōjō's government. In the subsequent Pacific War, Japan's technologically advanced navy decisively defeats the United States, and grants all of the former European and American colonies in Asia full independence. Later on, Yamamoto convinces Japan to join forces with the United States and Britain to defeat Nazi Germany. The series was criticized outside Japan as a whitewash of Imperial Japan’s intentions towards its neighbors, and distancing itself from the wartime alliance with Nazi Germany.

In Neal Stephenson's 1999 book Cryptonomicon, Yamamoto's final moments are depicted, with him realizing that Japan's naval codes have been broken and that he must inform headquarters.

In the 2001 film Pearl Harbor, Yamamoto was portrayed by Oscar-nominated Japanese-born American actor Mako Iwamatsu. Like Tora! Tora! Tora!, this film also features a version of the sleeping giant quote.

In the 2004 anime series Zipang, Yamamoto (voiced by Bunmei Tobayama) works to develop the uneasy partnership with the crew of the JMSDF Mirai, which has been transported back sixty years through time to the year 1942.

In the Axis of Time trilogy by author John Birmingham, after a naval task force from the year 2021 is accidentally transported back through time to 1942, Yamamoto assumes a leadership role in the dramatic alteration of Japan's war strategy.

In The West Wing episode "We Killed Yamamoto", the Chairman of the Joint Chiefs of Staff uses the killing of Yamamoto to advocate for an assassination.

In Douglas Niles' 2007 book MacArthur's War: A Novel of the Invasion of Japan (written with Michael Dobson), which focuses on General Douglas MacArthur and an alternate history of the Pacific War (following a considerably different outcome of the Battle of Midway), Yamamoto is portrayed sympathetically, with much of the action in the Japanese government seen through his eyes, though he could not change the major decisions of Japan in World War II.

In Toei's 2011 war film Rengō Kantai Shirei Chōkan: Yamamoto Isoroku (Blu-Ray titles:- English "The Admiral"; German "Der Admiral"), Yamamoto was portrayed by Kōji Yakusho. The film portrays his career from Pearl Harbor to his death in Operation Vengeance. 

In Robert Conroy's 2011 book Rising Sun, Yamamoto directs the IJN to launch a series of attacks on the American West Coast, in the hope the United States can be convinced to sue for peace and securing Japan's place as a world power; but cannot escape his lingering fear the war will ultimately doom Japan.

In the 2019 motion picture Midway, Yamamoto is portrayed by Etsushi Toyokawa.

References

Sources
 Agawa, Hiroyuki; Bester, John (trans.). The Reluctant Admiral. New York: Kodansha, 1979. . A definitive biography of Yamamoto in English. This book explains much of the political structure and events within Japan that led to the war.
 - Total pages: 994 
 Davis, Donald A. Lightning Strike: The Secret Mission to Kill Admiral Yamamoto and Avenge Pearl Harbor. New York: St. Martin's Press, 2005. .
 Dull, Paul S. A Battle History of the Imperial Japanese Navy, 1941–1945. Annapolis, Maryland: Naval Institute Press, 1978. .
 Evans, David C. and Mark R. Peattie. Kaigun: Strategy, Tactics, and Technology in the Imperial Japanese Navy 1887–1941. Annapolis, Maryland: Naval Institute Press, 1997. .
 Glines, Carroll V. Attack on Yamamoto (1st edition). New York: Crown, 1990. . Glines documents both the mission to shoot down Yamamoto and the subsequent controversies with thorough research, including personal interviews with all surviving participants and researchers who examined the crash site.
 Lundstrom, John B. The First Team: Pacific Naval Air Combat from Pearl Harbor to Midway. Annapolis, Maryland: Naval Institute Press, 1984. .
 Miller, Edward S. War Plan Orange: The U.S. Strategy to Defeat Japan, 1897–1945. Annapolis, Maryland: Naval Institute Press, 1991. .
 Peattie, Mark R. Sunburst: The Rise of Japanese Naval Air Power, 1909–1941. Annapolis, Maryland: Naval Institute Press, 2002. .
 Prados, John. Combined Fleet Decoded: The Secret History of American Intelligence and the Japanese Navy in World War II. Annapolis, Maryland: Naval Institute Press, 2001. .
 Prange, Gordon. At Dawn We Slept. New York: Penguin Books, 1982. .
 Ugaki, Matome; Chihaya, Masataka (trans.). Fading Victory: The Diary of Admiral Matome Ugaki, 1941–45. Pittsburgh: University of Pittsburgh Press, 1991. . Provides a high-level view of the war from the Japanese side, from the diaries of Yamamoto's Chief of Staff, Admiral Matome Ugaki. Provides evidence of the intentions of the imperial military establishment to seize Hawaii and to operate against Britain's Royal Navy in the Indian Ocean. Translated by Masataka Chihaya, this edition contains extensive clarifying notes from the U.S. editors derived from U.S. military histories.
 
 

External links

 Yamamoto biography from Spartacus Educational
 World War II Database: Isoroku Yamamoto biography
 World War II Database: Death of Yamamoto
 "Isoroku Yamamoto" Encyclopædia Britannica''
 Admiral Isoroku Yamamoto, Japanese Navy  US Naval Historical Center
 Pacific Wrecks. Place where Yamamoto Type 1 bomber crash
 The Great Pacific War
 The Assassination of Yamamoto in 1943 
 
 CombinedFleet.com, Isoroku Yamamoto
 

1884 births
1943 deaths
 
Attack on Pearl Harbor
Battle of Midway
Harvard University alumni
Imperial Japanese Navy marshal admirals
Japanese admirals of World War II
Japanese amputees
Japanese gamblers
Japanese military personnel killed in World War II
Japanese military personnel of the Russo-Japanese War
Japanese military personnel of World War II
People from Nagaoka, Niigata
Recipients of the Knight's Cross of the Iron Cross with Oak Leaves and Swords
Recipients of the Order of the Golden Kite, 1st class
Recipients of the Order of the Rising Sun with Paulownia Flowers
Recipients of the Order of the Sacred Treasure, 1st class
Victims of aircraft shootdowns
Japanese naval attachés
Japanese Go players
Imperial Japanese Naval Academy alumni
Deaths by firearm in Australia